Edgewood Park may refer to:

 Edgewood Historic District neighborhood in New Haven, Connecticut
 Edgewood Park in New Haven, Connecticut
 Edgewood Park & Natural Preserve, San Mateo County, California
 Edgewood Park neighborhood in Fort Erie, Ontario
 Edgewood Park neighborhood in Fort Wayne, Indiana
 Edgewood Park Historic District (New Orleans, Louisiana)
 Edgewood Park in Mississippi, containing Mississippi landmark train cars
 Edgewood Park, also called Indian Park, a now-defunct park in Shamokin, Pennsylvania